Barbara Augustine "Guusje" Woesthoff-Nederhorst (4 February 1969 – 29 January 2004) was a Dutch actress and singer.

Life and career
Nederhorst became known for playing Roos Alberts-de Jager in the soap Goede tijden, slechte tijden (GTST), a role she played from 1992 until 2000. With her GTST co-stars Babette van Veen and Katja Schuurman, she formed the girl group Linda, Roos & Jessica; the group performed under the names of their GTST characters. Nederhorst later appeared in the soap Onderweg naar morgen, the drama series All Stars, and the Curaçao-set telenovela Bon bini beach. 

Nederhorst married lawyer Sander Dikhoff in 1998, but the marriage ended in divorce. In September 2003, she married Kane frontman Dinand Woesthoff, with whom she had a son in June of that year. Soon after, it was announced that Nederhorst had breast cancer. She died of complications from the disease on 29 January 2004, six days before her 35th birthday.

References

External links 

1969 births
2004 deaths
Deaths from cancer in the Netherlands
Deaths from breast cancer
Dutch film actresses
Dutch pop singers
Dutch television actresses
Actresses from Amsterdam
Musicians from Amsterdam
20th-century Dutch actresses
21st-century Dutch actresses
Dutch soap opera actresses
20th-century Dutch women singers